Betty Paul (21 May 1921 – 27 February 2011) was a British actress, screenwriter, and novelist. She starred in stage plays, including one Broadway play. 

Paul wrote for television with her husband Peter Lambda. She received a nomination for a New York Critics' Award.

Early life
She was born Betty Percheron on 21 May 1921 at Hendon, in north-west London. She was the youngest of three children. Her French father was a furnishing fabrics importer and her mother was London Irish. She attended South Hampstead High School and the Institut Francais, later leaving at age 14 to be an actress, singer, and dancer due to the influence of her mother. In 1936, a year after the end of her education, she was in London's West End portraying Adele in Jane Eyre at Queen's Theatre. Two years later, she was the youngest member in C.B. Cochran's Young Ladies troupe.

Career
During World War II, she joined the Entertainments National Service Association (ENSA) which was a group that entertained troops. After performing in Lady Behave (1941) and Old Chelsea (1943), she decided to change her professional name to Betty Paul. She starred alongside the American actor Hartley Power in Lady Behave. Her first husband Robin Hood (brother of actress Miki Hood) died in 1944. She married Power in 1945 and then later divorced him, in 1955. During the early 1940s, Paul was on radio with Vic Oliver, Jimmy Jewel and Ben Warris Paul. Paul then acted in Bless the Bride (1947), Bitter Sweet (1949), Into the Blue, (1950), The Dish Ran Away, (1951), All for Mary (1954) and And So to Bed (1961). The 1953 Broadway play Maggie was her debut in an American stage production. Despite receiving positive reception, she never appeared in another Broadway musical.

During the 1950s, she appeared on stage and radio. Paul married her third husband, Hungarian-born sculptor Peter Lambda, in 1958 and they wrote for stage and television together. Their productions include creating the first rural soap opera — Weavers Green — The Probation Officer, and Harriet's Back in Town.
In 1979, Paul appeared in Cameron Mackintosh's stage production of My Fair Lady. She moved from London to Tibberton, Gloucestershire, in 1986. Here, Paul continued to write and around six of her radio plays were broadcast. Paul wrote the novels Lucky Star in 1989 and Conditions of Love in 1992. Lambda died in 1995. Paul died on 27 February 2011 in Tibberton, Gloucestershire.

Reception
John Chapman, writing for Daily News, said that Paul was "sweet and gifted" and that "few could both act and sing a role as she did". For her role in Maggie, she received a nomination for a New York Critics' Award.

References

External links
 
 
 

1921 births
2011 deaths
20th-century British actresses
British stage actresses
Entertainments National Service Association personnel